The 2022 Cavan Intermediate Football Championship was the 58th edition of Cavan GAA's premier Gaelic football tournament for intermediate graded clubs in County Cavan, Ireland. The tournament consists of 14 teams, with the winner representing Cavan in the Ulster Intermediate Club Football Championship.

The championship starts with a league stage and then progresses to a knock out stage.

Castlerahan returned to the senior grade at the first time of asking, beating Ballyhaise by a goal in the final.

Team Changes
The following teams have changed division since the 2021 championship season.

To Championship
Promoted from 2021 Cavan Junior Football Championship
  Denn - (Junior Champions)
Relegated from 2021 Cavan Senior Football Championship
  Shercock - (Relegation play-off Losers)
  Castlerahan - (Relegation play-off Losers)

From Championship
Promoted to 2022 Cavan Senior Football Championship
  Butlersbridge - (Intermediate Champions)
Relegated to 2022 Cavan Junior Football Championship
  Arva - (Relegation play-off Losers)
  Drumlane - (Relegation play-off Losers)

League stage

Round 1

Round 2

Round 3

Round 4

Knock-Out Stage

Quarter-finals

Semi-finals

Final

Relegation play-offs

References

External links
 Official Cavan GAA Website

Cavan Intermediate
Cavan GAA Football championships